Jin Jang-rim (born 15 October 1942) is a South Korean former breaststroke swimmer. He competed in the men's 200 metre breaststroke at the 1964 Summer Olympics.

References

External links
 

1942 births
Living people
South Korean male breaststroke swimmers
Olympic swimmers of South Korea
Swimmers at the 1964 Summer Olympics
Place of birth missing (living people)
Asian Games medalists in swimming
Asian Games bronze medalists for South Korea
Swimmers at the 1962 Asian Games
Medalists at the 1962 Asian Games
20th-century South Korean people